Mokri may refer to:

 Mokri (surname), an Iranian-Kurdish surname
 Mokri, India, a village in India
 Mokryan or Mokri, a Kurdish emirate 15h-19th century

See also 
 Mokryan